Sayanora Philip (born 1 March 1984) is an Indian playback singer who works in Malayalam and Tamil film industry.

Early life

Sayanora was born in Kannur. 
She did her schooling in St. Teresa's Anglo Indian Girls High School and is a professional degree holder from S. N. College, Kannur. She was appreciated for her singing abilities. She participated in many singing competitions during her school days and won many prizes.
Currently she lives in Chennai, Tamil Nadu.

Personal life

Sayanora is married to Winston Ashley de Cruz and has a daughter...

Filmography
 2022 : Wonder Women as Saya

Dubbing
  2018 : Rabbit Hole - Narrator
  2018 : Hey Jude - for Trisha
  2019 : Stand Up - for Nimisha Sajayan

Discography

Malayalam songs

Tamil songs

As music composer

Albums/singles

References

External links
 Official website
 
 The new indian express article
 Times of india article of sayanora's wedding

1984 births
Living people
Indian women playback singers
Tamil playback singers
Malayalam playback singers
Singers from Kannur
Film musicians from Kerala
Women musicians from Kerala
21st-century Indian singers
21st-century Indian women singers
Actresses in Malayalam cinema